The Diva Junction  Ratnagiri Passenger is a passenger train belonging to Konkan Railway that runs between Diva Junction and . It is currently being operated with 50103/50104 train numbers on a daily basis.

Average speed and frequency 

The 50103/Dadar Central–Ratnagiri Passenger runs with an average speed of 37 km/h and completes 336 km in 9h 10m. The 50104/Ratnagiri–Dadar Central Passenger runs with an average speed of 38 km/h and completes 336 km in 8h 50m.

Route and halts 

The important halts of the train are:

 
  
 Apta
 Jite
  
 Kasu

Coach composite 

The train has standard LHB rakes with max speed of 160 kmph. The train consists of 17 coaches:

 2 Second Sitting
 13 General Unreserved
 2 Seating cum Luggage Rake

Traction

Both trains are hauled by a Kalyan Loco Shed-based WCAM 2 or WCAM 3 electric locomotive from Ratnagiri to Diva, and vice versa. This was the first train on konkan railway to have an electric locomotive.

Rake sharing

The train shares its rake with 50101/50102 Ratnagiri–Madgaon Passenger and rake is maintained by Madgaon coaching depot.

Schedule
50103/50104 – runs daily.

See also 

 Dadar Central railway station
 Ratnagiri railway station
 Ratnagiri–Madgaon Passenger

Notes

References

External links 

 50103/Dadar–Ratnagiri Passenger India Rail Info
 50104/Ratnagiri–Dadar Passenger India Rail Info

Transport in Ratnagiri
Transport in Mumbai
Rail transport in Maharashtra
Slow and fast passenger trains in India
Konkan Railway